Al-Oloom wal-Technologia is an Iraqi football team based in Al-Jadriya, Baghdad, that plays in Iraq Division Three.

History

First female president
In April 2012, Mrs. Thorayya Najem was elected president of the club, becoming the first woman to hold this position as head of a sports club in Iraq.

Managerial history
 Jumaa Judayea
 Abdul Karim Jassim
 Shaker Salem

See also 
 2012–13 Iraq FA Cup
 2013–14 Iraq Division One

References

External links
 Al-Oloom wal-Technologia SC on Goalzz.com
 Iraq Clubs- Foundation Dates

2011 establishments in Iraq
Association football clubs established in 2011
Football clubs in Baghdad
Sport in Baghdad